Statistics  is a field of inquiry that studies the collection, analysis, interpretation, and presentation of data. It is applicable to a wide variety of academic disciplines, from the physical and social sciences to the humanities; it is also used and misused for making informed decisions in all areas of business and government.

Nature of statistics
Statistics can be described as all of the following:

 An  academic discipline: one with academic departments, curricula and degrees; national and international societies; and specialized journals.
 A scientific field (a branch of science) – widely recognized category of specialized expertise within science, and typically embodies its own terminology and nomenclature. Such a field will usually be represented by one or more scientific journals, where peer reviewed research is published.
 A formal science – branch of knowledge concerned with formal systems.
  A mathematical science –  field of science that is primarily mathematical in nature but may not be universally considered subfields of mathematics proper. Statistics, for example, is mathematical in its methods but grew out of political arithmetic which merged with inverse probability and grew through applications in the social sciences and some areas of physics and biometrics to become its own separate, though closely allied, field.

History of statistics
 History of statistics
 Founders of statistics
 History of probability
 Timeline of probability and statistics

Describing data 
Descriptive statistics
Average
Mean
Median
Mode
Measures of scale
Variance
Standard deviation
Median absolute deviation
Correlation
Polychoric correlation
Outlier
Statistical graphics
Histogram
Frequency distribution
Quantile
Survival function
Failure rate
Scatter plot
Bar chart

Experiments and surveys 
Design of experiments
Optimal design
Factorial experiment
Restricted randomization
Repeated measures design
Randomized block design
Cross-over design
Randomization
Statistical survey
Opinion poll

Sampling 
Sampling theory
Sampling distribution
Stratified sampling
Quota sampling
Cluster sampling
Biased sample
Spectrum bias
Survivorship bias

Analysing data 
Regression analysis
Outline of regression analysis
Analysis of variance (ANOVA)
General linear model
Generalized linear model
Generalized least squares
Mixed model
Elastic net regularization
Ridge regression
Lasso (statistics)
Survival analysis
Density estimation
Kernel density estimation
Multivariate kernel density estimation
Time series
Time series analysis
Box–Jenkins method
Frequency domain
Time domain
Multivariate analysis
Principal component analysis (PCA)
Factor analysis
Cluster analysis
Multiple correspondence analysis
Nonlinear dimensionality reduction
Robust statistics
Heteroskedasticity-consistent standard errors
Newey–West estimator
Generalized estimating equation
Bootstrapping (statistics)
Statistical classification
Metric learning
Generative model
Discriminative model
Online machine learning
Cross-validation (statistics)

Filtering data 
Recursive Bayesian estimation
Kalman filter
Particle filter
Moving average
SQL

Statistical inference 
Statistical inference
Mathematical statistics
Likelihood function
Exponential family
Fisher information
Sufficient statistic
Ancillary statistic
Minimal sufficiency
Kullback–Leibler divergence
Nuisance parameter
Order statistic
Bayesian inference
Bayes' theorem
Bayes estimator
Prior distribution
Posterior distribution
Conjugate prior
Posterior predictive distribution
Hierarchical bayes
Empirical Bayes method
Frequentist inference
Statistical hypothesis testing
Null hypothesis
Alternative hypothesis
P-value
Significance level
Statistical power
Type I and type II errors
Likelihood-ratio test
Wald test
Score test
Sequential probability ratio test
Uniformly most powerful test
Exact test
Confidence interval
Prediction interval
Decision theory
Optimal decision
Type I and type II errors
Decision rule
Minimax
Loss function
Mean squared error
Mean absolute error
Estimation theory
Estimator
Bayes estimator
Maximum likelihood
Trimmed estimator
M-estimator
Minimum-variance unbiased estimator
Consistent estimator
Efficiency (statistics)
Completeness (statistics)
Non-parametric statistics
Nonparametric regression
Kernels
Kernel method
Statistical learning theory
Rademacher complexity
Vapnik–Chervonenkis dimension
Probably approximately correct learning

Probability distributions 
Probability distribution
Symmetric probability distribution
Unimodal probability distribution
Conditional probability distribution
Probability density function
Cumulative distribution function
Characteristic function
List of probability distributions

Random variables 
Random variable
Central moment
L-moment
Algebra of random variables

Probability theory 
Probability
Conditional probability
Law of large numbers
Central limit theorem
Concentration inequality
Convergence of random variables

Computational statistics 
Computational statistics 
Markov chain Monte Carlo
Bootstrapping (statistics)
Jackknife resampling
Integrated nested Laplace approximations
Nested sampling algorithm
Metropolis–Hastings algorithm
Importance sampling
Mathematical optimization
Convex optimization
Linear programming
Linear matrix inequality
Quadratic programming
Quadratically constrained quadratic program
Second-order cone programming
Semidefinite programming
Newton-Raphson
Gradient descent
Conjugate gradient method
Mirror descent
Proximal gradient method
Geometric programming

Statistics software 
Free statistical software
List of statistical packages

Statistics organizations 
List of academic statistical associations
List of national and international statistical services

Statistics publications 
 List of statistics journals
List of important publications in statistics

Persons influential in the field of statistics
List of statisticians

See also

 
Combinatorics
Glossary of probability and statistics
Index of statistics articles
List of fields of application of statistics
List of graphical methods
Lists of statistics topics
Monte Carlo method
Notation in probability and statistics
Outline of probability
Philosophy of statistics
Simulation

Statistics, Outline of
Statistics
 Outline